The Ceraceosorales are an order of smut fungi in the class Exobasidiomycetes. It is a monotypic order, consisting of a single family, the Ceraceosoraceae, which in turn contain a single monotypic genus, Ceraceosorus. C. bombacis is a fungus that infects the tree Bombax ceiba in India. This economically important tree is used as an ornamental tree. Ceraceosorales was circumscribed in 2006; the family Ceraceosoraceae was validated in 2009. C. bombacis was originally described as Dicellomyces bombacis in 1973, but B.K. Bakshi transferred it to the newly described Ceraceosorus three years later.

References

External links

Ustilaginomycotina
Monotypic fungus taxa
Taxa described in 2006